The American Institute of Architecture Students (AIAS) is an independent, nonprofit, student-run organization providing programs, information, and resources on issues critical to architecture and the experience of education. The core focus of AIAS membership supports architecture students in collegiate schools across the United States, a population of approximately 25,000 students annually enrolled in accredited degree programs. In recent years, the AIAS has also expanded into international academic programs.

The organization represents one of five collateral organizations that govern the discipline of architecture in the United States, including allied organizations: the Association of Collegiate Schools of Architecture (ACSA), the National Architectural Accrediting Board (NAAB), National Council of Architectural Registration Boards (NCARB), and the American Institute of Architects (AIA). These governing bodies reflect the trajectory an architect will take during their career, from initial education, through licensure, and into practice.

AIAS publishes Crit, Journal of the AIAS (short for critique) and hosts events for students and professionals throughout the year, including FORUM, Grassroots Leadership Conference, and Quad Conferences. The organization was founded in 1956; it was originally called the National Architectural Student Association (NASA). Later the name changed to the Association of Student Chapters, AIA (ASC/AIA), before finding its present-day name the American Institute of Architecture Students.

History

NASA: Before the Space Age 
In 1956, architecture students established a continuing presence with the formation of the National Architectural Student Association (NASA). Chapters are established at all of the schools of architecture and a regional governance network is formed by the students at the first Student Forum. The students also elect Jim Barry (Rice Institute) as the first national president. Having accomplished the task of organizing a disparate array of local student activities into a collective voice, the ambitious students of NASA plant the seed for the nationally organized student voice from which we benefit from today.

Jim Barry serves as a part-time volunteer from his school with funding provided by the American Institute of Architects (AIA) and Washington-area architectural programs. During his term, NASA publishes the first issue of LINE magazine, has representatives involved on AIA committees and hosts many interesting programs at the Octagon. The members of NASA also attend AIA Convention in Los Angeles, with special programs designed specifically for students.

From NASA to ASC/AIA 
In 1958 the student organization is renamed the Association of Student Chapters, AIA (ASC/AIA), with the goal of bridging members to the AIA upon graduation. However, staff and leaders of the AIA are concerned in the early years about a separate student organization. It is believed this will conflict with the objective of encouraging students to maintain their memberships with both organizations. At the 1960 student convention (held on the campus of the University of California at Berkeley) the AIA board of directors proposed to abolish the ASC/AIA. John Richards, FAIA, then president of the AIA states, "[the student affiliations] of the past had not been as successful as had been hoped, and that it was feeling of the staff of the AIA that student organization structure was in need of improvement."

Students leaders lobbied to convince the AIA board of directors that the ASC/AIA chapter system was the foundation for the AIA and for the promotion of future generations entering architecture. Final remarks made by student president Charles Jones (University of Arizona) on this matter foreshadow what is to become. In his speech to the General Session of the AIA on April 22, 1960, he states, "The students have no desire to make this organization so large that it becomes completely out of hand." However, the organization did grow. At the 1970 AIA Convention student president Taylor Culver (Howard University) leads a student revolt. Minutes of the meeting report that Culver and his fellow students take over the podium held by the AIA president and display their strength and solidarity in numbers.

The strength of the organization continues to grow in all directions, and the responsibilities of the officers coincide. In 1972, two-term student president Fay D'Avignon (Boston Architectural Center) is elected as the first female president of the organization, and also becomes the first ASC/AIA officer to take full-time responsibilities in Washington, DC. This marks a new phase in the organization's efforts to become an autonomous voice of architectural students. This is a significant point when professionals and the AIA relinquish responsibilities to the ASC/AIA in many affairs that directly impact students. As a result, ASC/AIA develops into a unified national voice for students. The number of local chapters increases steadily as does the general membership. With the extra workload, it is clear that the vice president is also needed on a full-time basis in Washington, DC. In 1975 president Ella Hall (North Carolina State University) and vice president Steve Biegel (Syracuse University) become the first ASC/AIA national officers to work full-time in the National Office in Washington, D.C., as a team. The term for the national officers also changes to the July–June schedule, parallel to academic schedules.

Exhibiting unbridled energy, 1976–1977 team Jerry Compton (SCI-ARC) and Robert Rosenfeld (University of California, Berkeley) demonstrate creativity and clarity of vision. Notable achievements include solidifying the ASC/AIA growing operations budget, holding the first design competition, publishing the magazine Telesis, and establishing student representation on the IDP Coordinating Committee. Rosenfeld names Crit, which launches the rebranded publication the following year. Crit celebrated its 40th anniversary in 2016.

The following year, Rosenfeld continues on as vice president, with Charles Guerin (University of Houston) as president. These two officers start many current traditions of the organizations, including initiating the first ASC/AIA Chapter Honor Award and publishing the first issues of Crit. They also hold perhaps the most unusual competition to date, which concludes with the construction of a hot air balloon that is then launched over the Pacific Ocean.

In 1978 John Jeronimo (University of Miami) and Mary Beth Permar (Clemson University and The University of Illinois) collaborate on the continuation and improvement of Crit from a magazine format to a true architectural journal. Additionally, they increase the size of the board of directors to include the FORUM Chair and Crit Editor. The overall operating budget of the ASC/AIA passes the $100,000 mark for the first time in history. Jeronimo and Permar set in motion the largest national design competition to date, the first McDonald's Competition, which includes over 650 entries (only surpassed in number of entries by the Vietnam Memorial Design Competition).

A New Autonomy: AIAS, Inc. 

After several years of continued prosperity, the ASC/AIA arrives at a critical phase. The growth of the organization is beginning to outweigh the abilities and skills of the national officers alone.

In 1982, under the leadership of president William Plimpton (University of California, Berkeley) and vice president Nora Klebow (Kent State University), the ASC/AIA formally separated from the AIA and incorporated as an independent not-for-profit corporation.  To better prepare for the future, a special "Blue Ribbon" Task Force was formed in June 1982 to study the structure and operations of the organization.

In 1984, after a thorough self-examination, president Tom Fowler (New York Institute of Technology-Old Westbury) accepts the recommendations of the Special Task Force to review the structure of the organization. This report further suggests renaming the organization "The American Institute of Architecture Students" (AIAS), incorporating The organization hires the first full-time Executive Director, Carl D. Costello, who quickly exhibits outstanding administrative skills and an understanding of the interests and concerns of architecture students. That year the organization is officially incorporated in Washington, D.C., as The American Institute of Architecture Students, Inc.

With a fresh name and new independence, the AIAS leadership takes to the task of developing the organization. 1985 president Scott Norberg (University of Nebraska) and vice president Whitney Powers (Mississippi State University) dedicate themselves to examining issues that are critical to the architectural scene. During the Kent State Memorial Competition, Ian Taberner's award-winning proposal is rejected by the University "because he was not a citizen of the United States, as required by the design competition". This sparks debate within the AIAS and becomes an issue at the annual meeting. Participation at these meetings is exceptional: over 1,100 students attend the 1985 AIAS FORUM in New York.

Growth and prosperity 
The first meeting of AIAS Grassroots Leadership Conference was organized during the summer of 1985. This sets the beginning of a 30+ year legacy of chapter leaders from around the country gathering annually at the AIAS National Office in Washington, D.C., to discuss chapter issues, community involvement and participate in the governance of the organization. Also during 1985, the AIAS holds three national design competitions. In Norberg's second term, alongside vice president Lee W. Waldrep, Ph.D. (Arizona State University), the number of competitions increases to four; the AIAS initiates the Search for Shelter Program to address the growing issue of homelessness in America; and the AIAS contributes to the AIA Education Initiative by establishing the AIAS Outstanding Practitioner in Education award (which still exists today under a different name).

In 1988–1989 the AIAS accepts its first chapter outside the United States when the Council of Presidents votes to accept Ryerson Polytechnical Institute in Toronto, Ontario (Canada). AIAS strengthens its commitment to the housing for the homeless issue with active participation in the Habitat for Humanity program. The "Partners in Education" program is also founded. The sponsorship-based program provides interested individuals and corporations the opportunity to support students of architecture and the AIAS.

In 1989–1990 the AIAS moves into new office space, increases the full-time national office positions to five, and makes a major investment in desktop publishing software (which is very expensive at the time). The dues structure for local chapters is also revised to reflect a commitment to the organization by individual member dues, rather that a lump-sum from the entire school. One substantial outgrowth of this revision is the establishment of an active database which allows individual mailings of pertinent information to each AIAS member. A triumph for students this year is the inclusion of a standardized NAAB four-year degree language in college catalogs. This mandate is initiated by the AIAS and adopted by the five collateral architecture organizations the following year.

The 1990–1991 term sees the AIAS experience grow with the addition of thirteen chapters, which pushes membership to a then record 156 chapters. An additional full-time staff person is hired to coordinate AIAS competitions. The year's agenda is largely an affirmation of student commitment to environmental issues. The Environmental Action Committee (EAC) is established to gather information pertaining to environmental issues and their relationship to the design process, and disseminate this information to fellow students and educators. Two significant position papers on architectural education deficiencies and degree nomenclature are also presented to the collateral organizations by AIAS leaders during this term. These are included in a newly compiled, comprehensive set of AIAS governing documents.

The 1991–1992 officers, president Lynn N. Simon (University of Washington) and vice president Kevin P. McGillycuddy (Washington-Alexandria Center), emphasize a devotion to the quality of career counseling and the internship experience. Five national directors focus their endeavors on minority programs, affordable housing, women in architecture, community involvement and career options. The Five Presidents Declaration (five architecture collateral presidents) proposes a single designation for the professional degree in architecture, that sparks discussion and debate among students, educators and practitioners.

At the beginning of the 1992–1993 term the officers and staff work to make the office's duties manageable while combating a budget deficit. But there is continued development when the office produces a new handbook for each chapter to use on the local level, while the 1992–1993 national directors produce informational documents on career options and environmentally safe resources for the studio, and a video on women in architecture. A new system of regional coordinators is also set into place, the AIAS Long Range Plan is developed into a finished document, and the Sustainability Declaration is finalized for adoption by the four other collateral organizations. The membership is at 7,520.

1993–1994 president Garen D. Miller (Drury College) and vice president Christine A. Malecki (Carnegie Mellon University) hire former AIAS vice president Irene Dumas Tyson as executive director. The Council of Presidents (COP) votes to double individual dues with a goal to maintain a high membership level. Indeed, the 1993–1994 membership grew to 8,025. The AIAS enters the information highway with an e-mail address, involvement on the AIAOnline network, and develops of an all-electronic design competition. The COP approves a historic policy of the AIAS, requiring all speakers invited to AIAS events to verify that they pay their interns legally-mandated wages (still required of all AIAS speakers today). Following the lead of the AIAS, the board of directors of the Association of Collegiate Schools of Architecture (ACSA) and the AIA adopt similar policies.

At the 1995 Grassroots conference the Council of Presidents is offered three options for membership dues: $12 (the fee at the time), $24 or $36. Taking the appropriate action, the COP votes to triple the dues to $36/school year. Unfortunately, the consequence of this action is 42% drop in membership to 3,980 members, however, 85% of the chapters remain active. The AIAS enters its 40th year with decreased membership, but with leaders determined to re-grow the organization.

The next year, 1997–1998 president Robert L. Morgan (Clemson University) and vice president Rachel Livingston Ahalt (University of Colorado Denver) spend their term focusing on the financial viability of the National Office, and organizing AIAS Legacy members (former officers and directors) to defeat a proposal by the AIA board of directors to investigate the creation of a student category of membership within the AIA. The proposal sparks cohesiveness among AIAS members and debates at the 1998 AIA Convention reaffirm AIA members' support for the AIAS as an independent organization.

Heading toward the 50th Year 
The year 2002 sees the addition of two days to the Grassroots conference to focus on leadership education in collaboration with professionals from Georgetown University. The AIAS also reaches its healthiest financial position at the time with a strong organizational reserve, new investment policies, and professional management. Other organizational improvements included a shift in the terms of board of directors to coincide with the Grassroots conference, the creation of Personnel and Finance Committees, the initiation of a strategic planning process and a streamlining of the elections process.

In early 2003, Pam Kortan Day resigns as the executive director and the board of directors hires Michael V. Geary, CAE. Efforts then increase to better market the organization, increase membership, expand fundraising efforts, and prepare for the 50th anniversary. In 2004 the organization adopts a new logo and Web site. The new logo includes an "A" in the middle representing a design compass and the "A"s in the organization's acronym. Also at this time the masthead and interior of Crit, Journal of the AIAS and AIASinfo (the bimonthly electronic newsletter) are redesigned by Design Army to supposedly reflect the modern design aesthetics of the members.

By December 2007, the (Great Recession) begins causing significant damage within the construction industry. Many practicing designers in the field of architecture lose their jobs between 2007–2012. The United States hits an all time unemployment high, second only to the (Great Depression). The residual damage caused severe impact on architecture graduates trying to enter the field. Many left the practice of architecture entirely during 2007–2014. This major moment in time increased interest in alternative careers in architecture.
In 2008, president Andrew C. Caruso (Carnegie Mellon University) and vice president Tony P. Vanky (Tulane University) releases the AIAS Issue Brief on Architectural Education. With rapid changes in technology, this critical and anticipatory document highlighted issues relevant to the future education and practice of the profession. The brief was intended to impact the 2008 review of the National Architectural Accrediting Board Conditions for Accreditation, citing opportunities for necessary and visionary change by way of major themes such as ecological literacy, social responsibility, global change, urbanism, diversity, technology, and culture (among others).

2009 president JW Blanchard (Southern Polytechnic State University) focused on ensuring the legacy of Crit to continue as a valuable asset to the membership. Development of resources to assist Quads with conference planning were released, which expanded outreach of regional events within the four territories. Participation numbers for Quad conferences rose.

At the end of 2009, Michael V. Geary, CAE resigns as executive director, launching an Executive Search for the organization. Association Strategies is hired to assist in finding a qualified replacement. Joshua Caulfield, IOM is hired in spring of 2010. Between 2009–2011, president Je'Nen M. Chastain (University of North Carolina at Charlotte), vice president Brett Roeth (Miami University), and president Tyler W. Ashworth (University of Idaho) and vice president Danielle McDonough (Northeastern University) were faced with the challenge of transitioning the organization into the next decade. Strategic planning exercises started in 2006 are carried through to realize long discussed programs, policies, committees, and member benefits that will support growing professional needs of the membership. Implementation takes off quickly into 2011–2012. FORUM receives a record high attendance of 1,000+ students in Toronto, Ontario, Canada.

Under the leadership of president Nick Mancusi (Taliesin, The Frank Lloyd Wright School of Architecture) and vice president Laura Meador (Louisiana State University) the AIAS undergoes a Re:Branding effort. Advocacy also shifts forward as a strategic priority of the organization with the introduction of the Federal Student Loans (National Design Services Act). A four-year financial plan to double revenue is created, with the goal to achieve decade record high membership. New program tracks are introduced at the Grassroots Leadership Conference, and membership services are expanded. Continued growth takes place in 2011–2012. Gradual recovery from the (Great Recession) in the United States allows the profession of architecture to also recover.

In 2012 the AIAS is met with the resignation of Executive Director Joshua Caulfield, IOM. President Westin Conahan (University of Nevada, Las Vegas) hires Nick Serfass, CAE as the new executive director.

60 Years of Leadership, Design, and Service 
2016 marked the 60th anniversary of the organization. President Sarah Wahlgren (Auburn University) and vice president Rachel Law (Ryerson University) lead the celebrations and added an NCARB liaison to the Board of Directors. In 2018, the AIAS hosted its first international conference for students of architecture in the Middle East at the American University in Dubai - president Keshika de Saram (University of Minnesota) and vice president Elizabeth Seidel (University of Montana) attend the event. The following year, president Amelia Rosen (Carnegie Mellon University) creates a new strategic plan and establishes long-term goals for the organization.

The AIAS celebrated 15 years of Freedom By Design at FORUM 2019 in Toronto, Ontario. Executive director Nick Serfass, CAE left the AIAS after years of dedicated service and is replaced by Karma Israelsen, MA. The AIAS continues to expand oversees, seeing particular growth among students in Latin America and the Middle East. In 2020, new board positions are established for Latin America and the Middle East to represent international members in those regions. Advocacy continues to be a major focus of the organization, and president Sarah Curry (Auburn University) publishes the AIAS' promise to communities of color. The organization publishes a new document on learning and teaching culture to advocate for healthy learning environments and the board adopts a set of public policies.

The COVID-19 pandemic forces the AIAS to cease all in-person activities at the beginning of 2020. President Erin Conti (Illinois Institute of Technology) and vice president Sara Taketatsu (University of Colorado - Boulder) lead the board in efforts to adapt programs and events to a virtual environment. Membership numbers and engagement drop significantly during the pandemic as universities implement online classes and global lockdowns are put in place. Despite the difficulties, the AIAS successfully hosts its first virtual conference for Grassroots 2020 in July. During the second day of the virtual FORUM conference later that year, the deadly January 6 United States Capitol attack takes place mere blocks from the location of the AIAS office. The year ends with Ashley Ash taking over as interim executive director. A new board liaison position is created for the National Organization of Minority Architects (NOMA), and the AIAS begins to promote alternative career paths for graduates of architecture schools. The organization also creates a code of ethics and a permanent ethics committee.

2021-2022 officers Scott Cornelius (Oklahoma State University) and Shannon DeFranza (Roger Williams University) continue pandemic recovery efforts for the organization and work to strengthen relationships with allied organizations. President Cornelius passes a new, short-term strategic plan aimed at stabilizing the organization. All events are still completely virtual through the year, with the exception of one in-person Quad Conference hosted by Georgia Institute of Technology in Atlanta, GA. Larry H. Hoffer is hired as executive director in early 2022.

Grassroots 2022 is held in-person in Washington, D.C. for the first time in three years. Over 450 attendees participate in the event, an all-time high for the organization. A group of organizations that govern the profession of architecture, including the AIAS, come together and brand themselves as the 'alliance organizations' - president Cooper Moore (Kent State University) hosts the leadership of these organizations for the first meeting of the alliance a few months later. Supported by the Board and Staff, President Moore and Vice President Nicole Bass (City College of New York) oversee an increase in membership numbers for the first time in 7 years.

Programs

FORUM 
FORUM is the annual membership meeting of the AIAS, gathering 600–1,000 architecture students in one city over New Years. The AIAS signature conference, FORUM, is the largest annual gathering of architecture students in the world.

Quad Conferences 
Organized by the four regions of the AIAS: Northeast, Midwest, South, and West, Quad conferences bring students together at nearby schools of architecture.

Freedom by Design 
Freedom by Design is the community-service portfolio of the AIAS. Students use their design skills to address a wide variety of barriers in their communities.

Initially focused on just physical accessibility, the scope of Freedom by Design was expanded in 2017 to encompass a wider variety of student-driven projects.

A significant amount of support for Freedom by Design is provided by NCARB. NCARB offers both funding and mentorship for participants.

CRIT 
CRIT is the journal of the AIAS.

Competitions 
AIAS administers various competitions throughout the year.

Branding 
During the 60-year history of the AIAS, the name and branding of the organization has evolved.

Name change 
1956–1958, National Architectural Student Association (NASA)

1958–1984, Association of Student Chapters, AIA (ASC/AIA)

1984–present, American Institute of Architecture Students (AIAS)

Logo evolution 
Referred to as the "Dancing Bunnies" Logo, the previous logo was designed in 1985 by Kim Murray of Montana State University.

In 2004 the organization adopts a new logo and website. In 2004, the AIAS introduces a new logo with alternating layered shapes, that are reflective of both the past and forward looking. This suggests a progressive organization that is also respectful of its history. It includes an iconic "A" in the middle representing a compass (drawing tool), an "A" for architecture, and the "A"s in the organization's acronym. A compass is a technical drawing instrument that can be used for inscribing circles or arcs. As dividers, they can also be used as tools to measure distances, in particular on maps. Compasses can be used for mathematics, drafting, navigation, and other purposes. Members of the organization received a pin with this symbol and began wearing it on their lapel.

In 2011 the organization began a Re:Branding effort led by president Nick Mancusci (Taliesin, The Frank Lloyd Wright School of Architecture). The redesign was revisited again in 2015, as the organization explored modifications to simplify the 2004 logo.

Members and chapters 
The organization is made up of members from various chapters across the United States and abroad. Currently 6,000 members strong, the AIAS represents the nearly 25,000 architecture students enrolled in NAAB accredited programs. Being centralized in the U.S., regions are based on four geographic territories: Northeast Quad, Midwest Quad, South Quad, and West Quad.

Chapters follow the governing rules of the AIAS set forth in the Bylaws and Rules of the Board; however, every chapter also creates their independent culture based on location, design school philosophies, support from faculty and administrators, and engagement of students.

Chapter leaders serve on the Council of Presidents (COP). This governing body of the organization meets twice a year to vote on business of the AIAS, including election of the board of directors. Meetings of the COP occur at the Grassroots Leadership Conference in the summer and FORUM, the annual meeting during New Years break.

Midwest Quadrant 
 AIAS Illinois (University of Illinois at Urbana–Champaign)
 Andrews University
 Ball State University
 Bowling Green State University
 Drury University
 Dunwoody College of Technology
 Ferris State University
 Illinois Central College
 Illinois Institute of Technology
 Iowa State University
 Judson University
 Kansas State University
 Kent State University
 Lawrence Technological University
 Loyola Academy
 Miami University
 North Dakota State University
 Ohio State University
 Ranken Technical College
 School of the Art Institute of Chicago
 Southern Illinois University Carbondale
 University of Cincinnati
 University of Detroit Mercy
 University of Illinois at Chicago
 University of Kansas
 University of Kentucky
 University of Michigan
 University of Minnesota
 University of Nebraska at Lincoln
 University of Notre Dame
 University of Wisconsin–Milwaukee
 Western Kentucky University

Northeast Quadrant 
 Anne Arundel Community College
 Boston Architectural College
 The Catholic University of America
 City College of New York
 Cooper Union
 Cornell University
 Drexel University
 Fairmont State University
 Hampton University
 Howard University
 Keene State College
 Massachusetts College of Art and Design
 McGill University
 Morgan State University
 CUNY- New York City College of Technology
 NJIT- New Jersey Institute of Technology
 New York Institute of Technology- Old Westbury
 Northampton Community College
 Northern Virginia Community College – Alexandria
 Northeastern University*
 Norwich University
 Pennsylvania State University
 Philadelphia University
 Pratt Institute
 Rensselaer Polytechnic Institute
 Roger Williams University
 Ryerson University  -Intl 
 State University of New York at Morrisville
 Alfred State College
 Syracuse University
 Temple University
 Thaddeus Stevens College of Technology
 University at Buffalo
 University of Hartford
 University of Maine, Augusta
 University of Maryland, College Park
 University of Massachusetts Amherst
 University of Virginia
 Virginia Polytechnic Institute and State University

South Quadrant 
 AIAS Fort Lauderdale
 Auburn University
 Central Piedmont Community College
 Clemson University
 Florida A&M University
 Florida International University
 Georgia Institute of Technology
 Louisiana State University
 Louisiana Tech University
 Mississippi State University
 North Carolina State University
 Oklahoma State University
 Palm Beach State College
 Prairie View A&M University
 San Antonio College
 Savannah College of Art and Design
 Southern Polytechnic State University
 Texas A&M University
 Texas Tech University
 Tulane University
 Tuskegee University
 Universidad de Puerto Rico
 Polytechnic University of Puerto Rico (Universidad Politecnica de Puerto Rico)
 Pontifical Catholic University of Puerto Rico (Pontificia Universidad Católica de Puerto Rico)
 University of Arkansas
 University of Central Florida
 University of Florida
 University of Houston
 University of Louisiana at Lafayette
 University of Miami
 University of North Carolina at Charlotte
 University of Oklahoma
 University of South Florida
 University of Tennessee at Knoxville
 University of Texas at Arlington
 University of Texas at Austin
 University of Texas at San Antonio
 Valencia Community College

West Quadrant 
 Academy of Art University
 American University of Sharjah -Intl 
 American University in Dubai
 Arapahoe Community College
 Arizona State University
 Arizona Western College
 California State Polytechnic University, Pomona
 California Polytechnic State University at San Luis Obispo
 California College of the Arts
 College of the Canyons
 Comsumnes River College
 Cuesta College
 East Los Angeles College
 Kuwait University -Intl 
 Montana State University
 NewSchool of Architecture and Design
 Pikes Peak State College
 Portland State University
 Saddleback College
 Spokane Community College
 Stanford University
 Taliesin, Frank Lloyd Wright School of Architecture
 Truckee Meadows Community College
 University of Arizona
 University of Bahrain -Intl 
 University of California, Berkeley
 University of California, Los Angeles
 University of Colorado at Boulder
 University of Colorado at Denver
 University of Hawaii at Manoa
 University of Idaho
 University of Nevada, Las Vegas
 University of New Mexico
 University of Oregon
 University of San Diego
 University of San Francisco
 University of Southern California
 University of Utah
 University of Washington
 Ventura College
 Washington State University
 West Valley College
 Woodbury University
 Woodbury University-San Diego

 -Intl  = International Chapters

FORUM 
FORUM is the annual conference of the American Institute of Architecture Students, and is the largest annual gathering of architecture students in the world.

Legacy and Board of Directors 

The AIAS National Board of Directors are students and recent graduates elected by members to serve the organization's highest office for a one-year term. Elections include a rigorous candidacy at the AIAS annual meeting FORUM, including national speeches, Q&A, and networking. Once elected, the new board of directors undergoes a transition period from December to July. In July of each year the new board of directors is sworn into term at the National Building Museum (a member attended tradition started in 2011). Individuals are asked to "raise their drawing hand" in order to take the oath.

The President and Vice President, known as Officers, are hired full-time to work together on behalf of the organization out of the National Office in Washington, D.C. Presidents transition into the role of Past President upon completion of their term on the board. Quad Directors work with students from within their region, typically while still attending school. Liaisons are appointed from collateral organizations, including the Association of Collegiate Schools of Architecture and the American Institute of Architects. In recent years, the AIAS has added Regional Director positions to the Board to represent members of international chapters. The AIAS is supported by a full-time staff led by the executive director in Washington, D.C.

Legacy Members 
Members who have served the organization are honored with the title of Legacy Member.

 2001–2002:
Matthew Herb, President – University of Maryland
Aaron Koch, Vice President – University of Minnesota
 2000–2001:
Scott Baldermann, President – University of Nebraska
Nicole Kuhar, Vice President – University of Wisconsin at Milwaukee
 1999–2000:
Melissa Mileff, President – University of Oklahoma
John M. Cary Jr., Vice President – University of Minnesota
 1998–99:
Jay M. Palu, President – University of Nebraska
Amy J. Isenburg, Vice President – University of Illinois at Urbana–Champaign
 1997–98:
Robert L. Morgan, President – Clemson University
Rachel Livingston Ahalt, Vice President – University of Colorado at Denver
 1996–97:
Raymond H. Dehn, President – University of Minnesota
Casius Pealer, Vice President – Tulane University
 1995–96:
Robert J. Rowan, President – Washington State University
Shannon Kraus, Vice President – Southern Illinois University
 1994–95:
Dee Christy Briggs, President – City College of New York
Elizabeth M. Koski, Vice President – Arizona State University
 1993–94:
Garen D. Miller, President – Drury College
Christine A. Malecki, Vice President – Carnegie Mellon University
 1992–93:
Courtney E. Miller, President – University of Maryland
Leigh Chatham Hubbard, Vice President – North Carolina State University
 1991–92:
Lynn N. Simon, President – University of Washington
Kevin P. McGillycuddy, Vice President – Washington-Alexandria Center
 1990–91:
Alan D.S. Paradis, President – Roger Williams College
David T. Kunselman, Vice President – Carnegie Mellon University
 1989–90:
Douglas A. Bailey, President – Montana State University
Catherine R. Miller, Vice President – University of Wisconsin–Milwaukee
 1988–89:
Matthew W. Gilbertson, President – University of Minnesota
Irene Dumas Tyson, Vice President – Mississippi State University
 1987–88:
Kent Davidson, President – University of Nebraska
Karen Cordes, Vice President – University of Arkansas
 1986–87:
Scott Norberg, President – University of Nebraska
Lee W. Waldrep, Ph.D., Vice President – Arizona State University
 1985–86:
Scott Norberg, President – University of Nebraska
Whitney Powers, Vice President – Mississippi State University
 1984–85:
Thomas Fowler IV, President – NYIT–Old Westbury
Christine Reinke, Vice President – University of Miami
 1983–84:
Robert Fox, President – Temple University
Darrel Babuk, Vice President – Montana State University
 1982–83:
Robert Klancher, President – University of Cincinnati
Christina Vina, Vice President – Texas Tech University
 1981–82:
Bill Plimpton, President – University of California at Berkeley
Nora Klebow, Vice President – Kent State University
 1980–81:
Alejandro Barberena, President – University of Houston
Margie Miller, Vice President – Arizona State University
 1979–80:
Richard Martini, President – Boston Architectural Center
Kimberly Stanley, Vice President – Clemson University
 1978–79:
John Maudlin-Jeronimo, President – University of Miami
Mary Beth Permar, Vice President – Clemson University
 1977–78:
Charles Guerin, President – University of Houston
Robert Rosenfeld, Vice President – University of California at Berkeley
 1976–77:
Jerry Compton, President Southern – California Inst. of Architecture
Robert Rosenfeld, Vice President – University of California at Berkeley
 1975–76:
Ella Hall, President – North Carolina State University
Steve Biegel, Vice President – Syracuse University
 1974–75:
Patric Davis, President – Boston Architectural Center
Ella Hall, Vice President – North Carolina State University
 1973–74:
Fay D’Avignon, President – Boston Architectural Center
Perry Reader, Vice President – University of Florida
 1972–73:
Fay D’Avignon, President – Boston Architectural Center
Patrick Delatour, Vice President – Howard University
 1971–72:
Joseph Siff, President – Rice University
Robert Graham, Vice President – Howard University
Mark Maves, Vice President – University of California at Berkeley
James Miller, Vice President – University of California at Berkeley
Bruce Webb, Vice President – Montana State University
 1970–71:
Michael Interbartolo, President – Boston Architectural Center
Stephan Castellanos, Vice President – California Polytechnic State
Gene Lindman, Vice President – University of Illinois at Chicago
Jack Mathis, Vice President – Auburn University
 1969–70:
Taylor Culver, President – Howard University
Jim Kollaer, Vice President – Texas Tech University
Jim Brown, Secretary/Treasurer – Georgia Institute of Technology
 1968–69:
Edward Mathes, President – University of Southwestern Louisiana
Ray Franklin Kenzie, Vice President – Virginia Polytechnic Institute and State University
Richard Kidwell, Secretary/Treasurer – Arizona State University
 1967–68:
Morten Awes, President – University of Idaho
 1966–67:
Jack Worth III, President – Georgia Institute of Technology
 1965–66:
Kenneth Alexander, President – Pratt Institute
 1964–65:
Joseph Morse, President – Howard University
 1962–63:
Carl Schubert, President – California State Polytechnic University
 1961–62:
Donald Williams, President – University of Illinois at Urbana–Champaign
 1960–61:
Ray Gaio, President – University of Notre Dame
Alexi Vergun, Vice President – Massachusetts Institute of Technology
 1959–60:
Charles Jones, President – University of Arizona
Alexi Vergun, Vice President – Massachusetts Institute of Technology
 1958–59:
Paul Ricciutti, President – Case Western Reserve University
Eugene Burr, Vice President
Allen Roth, Secretary/Treasurer
 1957–58:
Robert Harris, President – Princeton University
 1956–57:
James R. Barry, President – Rice University
Robert Harris, Vice President – Princeton University
Laurie M. Maurer, Secretary/Treasurer

See also 
 American Institute of Architects
 National Architectural Accrediting Board
 National Council of Architectural Registration Boards
 Society of Architectural Historians (SAH)

Footnotes

External links 
 

Organizations established in 1956
Architecture groups
Architecture organizations based in the United States
Student societies in the United States